Warnerville Hill is a mountain in Schoharie County, New York. It is located south-southeast of Cobleskill. Donats Mountain is located north and Petersburg Mountain is located southeast of Warnerville Hill.

References

Mountains of Schoharie County, New York
Mountains of New York (state)